Hamaxiella brunnescens is a species of tachinid flies in the genus Hamaxiella of the family Tachinidae.

External links

Tachinidae